Jathedar Jagdev Singh Khuddian (1937–1989) was a Sikh politician from Punjab who was Member of Parliament, winning from Faridkot in 1989 for the Shiromani Akali Dal (Simranjit Singh Mann) party.

Personal life 
Jathedar Jagdev Singh Khuddian was born in 1937 in Faridkot, Punjab, India. He was an Agriculturist by profession. His son is Gurmeet Singh Khuddian. His son Gurmeet Singh Khuddian defeated SAD veteran and Shiromani Akali Dal Patron Parkash Singh Badal from Lambi in 2022 Punjab Assembly Elections.

Death 
On December 28, 1989 Khuddian had disappeared from his home in Khudian village. Six days later his body was fished out of the nearby Rajasthan Feeder Canal.

References 

India MPs 1989–1991
Lok Sabha members from Punjab, India
1989 deaths
1937 births
Shiromani Akali Dal politicians